The Nieuport-Delage NiD 120 series was a series of French single-seat parasol monoplane fighter aircraft of the 1930s. It was built in a number of versions, fitted with various types of engines, with six aircraft designated NiD 123 being sold to Peru.

Design and development
In 1930, the Armée de l'Air (or French Air Force) issued a specification for a single-seat fighter to be powered by a 650 hp (485 kW) engine and required to reach a speed of 350 km/h (217 mph) and a height of 9,000 m (29,500 ft). A total of 27 designs were offered by French manufacturers, of which one was selected for development to prototype status. Nieuport-Astra's design was a parasol monoplane with the wing mounted just above the fuselage on short cabane struts. A hole was cut out of the wing immediately above the pilot's cockpit, allowing the pilot to raise his seat so that his head was just above the wing for a better upwards view. The engine was cooled using an unusual radiator built into the wing, where air was sucked in through slots in the leading edge of the wing and expelled through the trailing edge. A fixed tailwheel undercarriage was fitted. Two versions were proposed, one, the Nieuport-Delage NiD 121, powered by a Lorraine-Dietrich 12H water-cooled V12 engine and the other, the NiD 122, powered by a Hispano-Suiza 12X engine of similar layout.

First to fly on 23 July 1932 was the Hispano-powered NiD 122, piloted by Joseph Sadi-Lecointe, with the NiD 121 following on 25 November 1932. The NiD 122 was destroyed in a crash on 13 April 1933 when severe wing flutter caused an aileron to break off while the aircraft was being demonstrated in front of representatives of the Parliament of France. Testing continued, with a second NiD 122 flying in July 1933. While performance was good, with the NiD 121 reaching 367 km/h (226 mph), it was criticised for a weak undercarriage while its novel radiator was considered vulnerable to damage in combat, giving poor performance at high angles of attack, and the Dewoitine D.500 was selected instead.

The NiD 121 was tested by representatives of the Peru Air Force in September 1933, and an order was made for six aircraft that could be fitted with either wheeled or floatplane undercarriages. A prototype of the Peruvian fighter flew on 18 July 1934. A final version, the NiD 125, was built for evaluation by the Armée de l'Air, featuring a more powerful Hispano-Suiza 12Y engine with provision for a 20 mm cannon firing through the propeller hub, and with the wing mounted radiators replaced by more conventional radiators mounted on the sides of the fuselage. The sole prototype flew in June 1934, but despite good performance, a similarly powered and armed version of the Dewoitine D.500, the D.510 was chosen for production.

Variants

Nieuport-Delage NiD 121
Powered by one 670 hp (500 kW) Lorraine-Dietrich 12H engine. One built.
Nieuport-Delage NiD 122
Powered by 690 hp (515 kW) Hispano-Suiza 12Xbrs engine. Two built.
Nieuport-Delage NiD 123
Fighter for Peru with convertible wheel/float undercarriage, powered by 720 hp (537 kW) Lorraine-Detrich 12Hdrs engine. One prototype plus six production aircraft.
Nieuport-Delage NiD 125
Improved fighter with 860 hp (642 kW) Hispano-Suiza 12Ycrs engine and revised cooling system. Reached 400 km/h (248 mph) during testing. One built.

Operators

Peru Air Force - The six production NiD 123s were delivered to Peru in 1935.

Specifications (NiD 123 (floatplane))

See also

Notes

References

Green, William and Gordon Swanborough. The Complete Book of Fighters. New York: Smithmark, 1994. . 
Hartmann, Gérard. "Les avions Nieuport-Delage". La Coupe Schneider et hydravions anciens. Retrieved 29 October 2010.

Parasol-wing aircraft
1930s French fighter aircraft
 1200